The 2021–22 Champions Hockey League was the seventh season of the Champions Hockey League, a European ice hockey tournament. The tournament was competed by 32 teams, with qualification being on sporting merits only. The six founding leagues were represented by between three and five teams (based on a four-year league ranking), while seven "challenge leagues" were to be represented by one team each.

Swedish team Rögle BK won their first Champions Hockey League title, defeating Finnish team Tappara 2–1 in the final. This made Rögle BK the sixth Swedish side to win the European Trophy and the first team in the history of the tournament to win the title in its first season. The title holders Frölunda HC were defeated by Rögle BK in the semi-finals with the total score 4–8.

American right winger Ryan Lasch from Swedish team Frölunda HC became the top scorer for the fourth time, scoring 18 points.

Team allocation
A total of 32 teams from different European first-tier leagues participated in the 2021–22 Champions Hockey League. Besides the Continental Cup champions, 24 teams from the six founding leagues, as well as the national champions from Norway, Denmark, France, Belarus, the United Kingdom, Poland and Ukraine could qualify. The qualification for these places was set out in the rules as follows:

 CHL champions
 National league champions (play-off winners)
 Regular season winners
 Regular season runners-up
 Regular season third-placed team
 Regular season fourth-placed team
 Regular season fifth-placed team

For the ICE Hockey League teams were picked in this order:
 League champions
 Regular season winners
 Pick Round winners
 Pick Round runners-up
 Losing playoff finalists

For the Deutsche Eishockey Liga teams were picked in this order:
 League champions
 North / South group winners with higher PPG
 North / South group winners with lower PPG
 North / South group runners-up with higher PPG
 North / South group runners-up with lower PPG

Teams

Round and draw dates
The schedule of the competition is as follows.

Group stage

For the group stage, the teams were drawn into 8 groups of 4 teams. Each team played home and away against every other team for a total of six games. The best two teams qualified to the round of 16.

The draw of the group stage took place on 19 May 2021.

Pots
Due to a scheduling conflict caused by the 2022 Winter Olympics final qualification tournament being held on 26–29 August 2021, eight teams from countries participating in the Olympic qualification (Austria, Denmark, France, Italy, Norway, Poland, Ukraine) were be allocated into the pot 5 and drawn into two separate groups of four which did not play their games on the specified dates. There was no league protection for the teams from these two groups. The other 24 teams (from five remaining founding leagues as well as teams from Belarus and the United Kingdom as top two challenger leagues and 2019–20 IIHF Continental Cup winners SønderjyskE Ishockey) were allocated into four pots and drawn by the standard procedure into six groups of four.

Group A

Group B

Group C

Group D

Group E

Group F

Group G

Group H

Group stage tie-breaking criteria
Teams were ranked according to points (3 points for a win in regulation time, 2 poins for a win in overtime, 1 point for a loss in overtime, 0 points for a loss in regulation time). If two or more teams were tied on points, the following tiebreaking criteria were applied, in the order given, to determine the rankings (see 8.4.4. Tie breaking formula group stage standings):
Points in head-to-head matches among the tied teams;
Goal difference in head-to-head matches among the tied teams;
Goals scored in head-to-head matches among the tied teams;
The higher number of goals in one of the matches among the tied teams;
The most goals in the two game winning shot series;
If more than two teams are tied, head-to-head criteria 1, 2 and 3 are reapplied exclusively to this subset of teams;
If more than two teams are tied, and after applying head-to-head criteria 1, 2 and 3, a subset of teams are still tied, goal difference and goals scored then the results between each of the three teams and the closest best-ranked team outside the subset was applied; best-ranked team outside the sub-group was applied;
The higher position in the 2019–20 Champions Hockey League club ranking;
Goal difference in all group matches;
Goals scored in all group matches;
Regulation time wins in all group matches;
Overtime wins in all group matches;
Overtime losses in all group matches.

Playoffs

Qualified teams
The knockout phase involves the 16 teams which qualify as winners and runners-up of each of the eight groups in the group stage.

Format
In each round except the final, the teams played two games and the aggregate score decided which team advanced. As a rule, the first leg was hosted by the team who had the inferior record in the tournament with the second leg being played on the home ice of the other team. If aggregate score was tied, a sudden death overtime followed. If the overtime was scoreless, the team who won the shoot out competition advanced.

The final was played on the home ice of the team who had the better record in the tournament.

Bracket
The eight group winners and the eight second-placed teams advanced to the round of 16. The teams were divided into two seeding groups and group winners were randomly drawn against runners-up. Teams who had faced each other in the group stage could not be drawn against each other in the round of 16.

Round of 16
The draw for the entire playoff was held on 15 October 2021 in Zürich. The first legs were played on 16 and 17 November with return legs played on 23 and 24 November 2021.

|}

Quarter-finals
First legs were played on 7 December, return legs were played on 14 December 2021.

|}

Semi-finals
First legs were played on 4 January, return legs were played on 11 January and 1 February 2022.

|}

Final

Statistics

Scoring leaders
The following players are leading the league in points.

Leading goaltenders
The following goaltenders are leading the league in save percentage, provided that they have played at least 40% of their team's minutes.

Notes

References

 
2021
Champions